"Groove On" is a song from the British pop duo Thompson Twins, which was released in 1992 as the third single from their eighth studio album Queer (1991). The song was written and produced by Alannah Currie and Tom Bailey.

Background
"Groove On" was released as a single in the United States only in February 1992. It was the third single to be released from Queer, but only the second to be released in US. "Groove On" was the follow-up to "Come Inside", which had achieved success on the Billboard Hot Dance Music Club Play and 12-inch Singles Sales charts in 1991. Although "Groove On" failed to replicate the same level of success as its predecessor, the single did reach number 3 on the Billboard Hot Dance Breakouts Club Play chart in February 1992.

Critical reception
On its release in the US, Larry Flick, writing for Billboard, described "Groove On" as a "smokin' down-tempo houser". He considered the remixes of the song to "work extremely well", with Tommy Musto adding "a jazzy touch" and Rev. T "accelerat[ing] the track to a frenetic techno pace". He added that the resulting "quite appealing" release "comes [with] a wide variety of moods, ranging from slow 'n' sleazy deep house to frenetic techno".

Black Radio Exclusive commented, "Thompson Twins have a definite body rockin' tune with this house-styled groove. It shows hints of R&B and house throughout. A wicked techno mix should help this one in the clubs and on various mix formats." DJ Andy Kastanas, writing for The Charlotte Observer, commented, "There's a version for every taste on the single, beginning with a downtempo vocal mix that'll rock you and a severely uptempo 'rave' instrumental that'll roll you!"

Formats

Personnel
Credits are adapted from the US 12-inch and CD single sleeve/liner notes.

Production
 Tom Bailey, Alannah Currie – producers
 Keith Fernley – assistant producer
 Rev. T – additional production and remixer ("Single Remix", "Club Groove", "Church Dub Groove")
 Tommy Musto – additional production, programming and remixer ("Club Edit", "Techno Groove Mix", "Headbanger Dub")
 Rob "Retro" Paustian – mix engineer ("Club Edit", "Techno Groove Mix", "Headbanger Dub")
 Peter Dauo – keyboards ("Club Edit", "Techno Groove Mix", "Headbanger Dub")

Other
 Heather Laurie – design

Charts

References

1991 songs
1992 singles
Warner Records singles
Thompson Twins songs
Songs written by Alannah Currie
Songs written by Tom Bailey (musician)